The 2005–06 Argentine Primera B Nacional was the 20th season of second division professional of football in Argentina. A total of 20 teams competed; the champion and runner-up were promoted to Argentine Primera División.

Club information

Torneo Apertura Standings

Playoffs

Torneo Clausura Standings

Overall standings

Promotion Playoff
This leg was played between the Apertura Winner: Godoy Cruz; and the Clausura Winner: Nueva Chicago. The winning team was declared champion and was automatically promoted to 2006–07 Primera División and the losing team played the Second Promotion Playoff.

|-
!colspan="5"|Promotion Playoff

Second Promotion Playoff
This leg was played by Nueva Chicago, the losing team of the Promotion Playoff, and Belgrano, who was the best team in the overall standings under the champions. The winning team was promoted to 2006–07 Primera División and the losing team played the Promotion Playoff Primera División-Primera B Nacional.

|-
!colspan="5"|Promotion Playoff

Torneo Reducido
It was played by the teams placed 3rd, 4th 5th and 6th in the Overall Standings: Chacarita Juniors (3rd), Huracán (4th), San Martín (SJ) (5th) and Talleres (C) (6th). The winning team played the Promotion Playoff Primera División-Primera B Nacional.

Semifinals

|-
!colspan="5"|Semifinals

!colspan="5"|Semifinals

Final

|-
!colspan="5"|Semifinals

Promotion Playoff Primera División-Primera B Nacional
The Second Promotion playoff loser (Belgrano) and the Torneo Reducido Winner (Huracán) played against the 18th and the 17th placed of the Relegation Table of 2005–06 Primera División.

|-
!colspan="5"|Relegation/promotion playoff 1

|-
!colspan="5"|Relegation/promotion playoff 2

 Argentinos Juniors remains in Primera División after a 3-3 aggregate tie by virtue of a "sports advantage". In case of a tie in goals, the team from the Primera División gets to stay in it.
 Belgrano was promoted to 2006–07 Primera División by winning the playoff and Olimpo de Bahía Blanca was relegated to the 2006–07 Primera B Nacional.

Relegation

Note: Clubs with indirect affiliation with AFA are relegated to the Torneo Argentino A, while clubs directly affiliated face relegation to Primera B Metropolitana. Clubs with direct affiliation are all from Greater Buenos Aires, with the exception of Newell's, Rosario Central, Central Córdoba and Argentino de Rosario, all from Rosario, and Unión and Colón from Santa Fe.

Relegation Playoff Matches

|-
!colspan="5"|Relegation/promotion playoff 1 (Direct affiliation vs. Primera B Metropolitana)

|-
!colspan="5"|Relegation/promotion playoff 2 (Indirect affiliation vs. Torneo Argentino A)

|-
|}

Defensa  y Justicia remains in Primera B Nacional after a 4-4 aggregate tie by virtue of a "sports advantage". In case of a tie in goals, the team from the Primera B Nacional gets to stay in it.
San Martín (T) was promoted to 2006–07 Primera B Nacional by winning the playoff and San Martín (M) was relegated to 2006–07 Torneo Argentino A.

See also
2005–06 in Argentine football

References

External links

Primera B Nacional seasons
2005–06 in Argentine football leagues